George Anson Wedge (1890–1964) was an American music writer who served as the dean of Juilliard School of Music between 1939 and 1946.

Early life and career 
Wedge received his education from Juilliard School of Music where he received diplomas in organ and piano. He was also given an honorary doctorate degree from Ursinus College, Pennsylvania.

In November 1964, he died at the age of 74.

During his career, he taught at New York University from 1920 to 1927 and the Curtis Institute of Music from 1924 to 1926.

Publications 
  Advanced ear-training and sight-singing as applied to the study of harmony: a continuation of the practical and coordinated course for schools and private study
 Ear training and sight singing
 Applied harmony in 2 vol.

References 

1890 births
1964 deaths
20th-century American writers
American organists
Juilliard School alumni
Juilliard School faculty